Sheikh Fazal-ur-Rehman (born 11 June 1935) is a former Pakistani cricketer who played in one Test in 1958.

He was educated at Islamia College, Lahore. After he retired from cricket, he completed a Master's degree in Islamic Studies and became a devout Muslim, giving weekly sermons.

References

External links
 
 

1935 births
Living people
Pakistan Test cricketers
Cricketers from Amritsar
Pakistani cricketers
Punjab University cricketers
Pakistan Universities cricketers
Punjab A cricketers
Lahore cricketers
Punjab (Pakistan) cricketers
Pakistan Eaglets cricketers
Government Islamia College alumni
Pakistani missionaries
Pakistani Muslims